Senator Wright may refer to:

Members of the United States Senate
George G. Wright (1820–1896), U.S. Senator from Iowa from 1871 to 1877
Joseph A. Wright (1810–1867), U.S. Senator from Indiana from 1862 to 1863
Robert Wright (Maryland politician) (1752–1826), U.S. Senator from Maryland from 1801 to 1806; also served in the Maryland State Senate
Silas Wright (1795–1847), U.S. Senator from New York from 1833 to 1844
William Wright (United States politician) (1794–1866), U.S. Senator from New Jersey from 1853 to 1859, and from 1863 to 1866

United States state senate members
Ambrose R. Wright (1826–1872), Georgia State Senate
Benjamin D. Wright (1799–1874), Florida State Senate
Cathie Wright (1929–2012), California State Senate
Dan S. Wright (1802–1867), New York State Senate
Dexter Russell Wright (1821–1886), Connecticut State Senate
Donald O. Wright (1892–1985), Minnesota State Senate
Fielding L. Wright (1895–1956), Mississippi State Senate
Gerald Wright (politician) (born 1942), Oklahoma State Senate
Hiram A. Wright (1823–1855), Wisconsin State Senate
James A. Wright (Wisconsin politician) (1873–1911), Wisconsin State Senate
James W. Wright (fl. 1990s–2000s), New York State Senate
Joe Wright (Kentucky politician) (fl. 1970s–1990s), Kentucky State Senate
John C. Wright (New York politician) (1801–1862), New York State Senate
Nathaniel Wright (1785–1858), Massachusetts State Senate
Roderick Wright (politician) (born 1952), California State Senate
Roy V. Wright (1876–1948), New Jersey State Senate
Tom A. Wright (born 1952), Florida State Senate